Yelicones is a genus of braconid wasps in the family Braconidae. There are at least 120 described species in Yelicones.

See also
 List of Yelicones species

References

Further reading

External links

 

Parasitic wasps